Idaea poecilocrossa is a moth of the family Geometridae. It is found in northern Madagascar and on the Seychelles.

This species has a wingspan of 9-13mm. The forewings are narrow with a very long cell; whitish; easily recognizable by its thick sinuous postmedian line placed close to termen and its violet-grey subterminal shading, brown costal edge and fringe. 
The cell dot is black, median line nearly straight. The hindwings are distally similar to the forewings.

References

Sterrhini
Moths described in 1932
Moths of Madagascar
Moths of Africa